Riyad  is a suburb of Nouakchott and urban commune in western Mauritania. It has a population of 42,413.

References

Communes of Mauritania
Nouakchott